In Bulgaria, a Grand National Assembly (Велико народно събрание, Veliko narodno sabranie) is a special meeting of the National Assembly which may be convened in order for matters of special jurisdiction.

The first Grand National Assembly of Bulgaria was conducted from April 17 to June 26, 1879. Its chairman was Anthim I.

History
In the first Grand National Assembly, Alexander of Battenberg was chosen as Prince of Bulgaria.

The second assembly opened on July 1, 1881, with conservative Todor Ikonomov as chairman; the third commenced in 1886, with 443 members and chaired by Georgi Zhivkov; the fourth convened from May 3 to 17, 1893, with chairman Dimitar Petkov.

In the fifth Great National Assembly which convened in 1911 with chairman Stoyan Danev, the title "knyaz" was changed to "tsar" and the assembly passed the Tarnovo Constitution.

The sixth assembly convened in 1946 with chairman Vasil Kolarov. It passed the first constitution of the People's Republic of Bulgaria.

The seventh Grand National Assembly passed the Constitution of the Republic of Bulgaria on July 12, 1991.

The 1st, 2nd, 3rd, 4th and 5th Grand National Assemblies were convened in Veliko Tarnovo while the 6th and 7th were conducted in Sofia.

References

1879 establishments in Bulgaria
1879 in Bulgaria
1881 in Bulgaria
1886 in Bulgaria
1893 in Bulgaria
1911 in Bulgaria
1949 in Bulgaria
1991 in Bulgaria
National Assembly (Bulgaria)
Political history of Bulgaria
History of Veliko Tarnovo
History of Sofia